Henri Mottier (born 5 June 1936) is a Swiss wrestler. He competed in the men's freestyle middleweight at the 1960 Summer Olympics.

References

External links
 

1936 births
Living people
Swiss male sport wrestlers
Olympic wrestlers of Switzerland
Wrestlers at the 1960 Summer Olympics
Sportspeople from Valais